The R476 road is a regional road in central County Clare in Ireland.

The government legislation that defines the R476, the Roads Act 1993 (Classification of Regional Roads) Order 2012 (Statutory Instrument 54 of 2012), provides the following official description:

R476: Ennis - Lisdoonvarna, County Clare

Between its junction with N85 at Fountain Cross and its junction with N67 at Lisdoonvarna via Ballycullinan Bridge, Ballykinnacorra, Corrofin, Killinaboy, Leamaneh Cross, Kilfenora, Ballykeel and Gowlaun Bridge all in the county of Clare.

See also
Roads in Ireland
National primary road
National secondary road
Regional road
O'Dea Castle
Battle of Dysert O'Dea

References

Regional roads in the Republic of Ireland
Roads in County Clare